Ancourteville-sur-Héricourt is a commune  in the Seine-Maritime department in the Normandy region in northern France.

Geography

Population

Places of interest
 The church of Sainte-Marie, dating from the eighteenth century
 A sixteenth-century stone cross.

See also
Communes of the Seine-Maritime department

References

Communes of Seine-Maritime